Once and Again is an American family drama television series that aired on ABC from September 21, 1999, to April 15, 2002. It depicts the family of a single mother and her romance with a single father. It was created by Marshall Herskovitz and Edward Zwick.

One of the show's unique aspects was the "interview" sequences filmed in black and white and interspersed throughout each episode, where the characters would reveal their innermost thoughts and memories to the camera.

Premise
Lily Manning (Sela Ward) is a suburban soccer mom in her forties, who lives in Deerfield, Illinois. Recently separated from her philandering husband Jake (Jeffrey Nordling), Lily is raising her two daughters, insecure, anxiety-ridden 14-year-old Grace (Julia Whelan), and precocious nine-year-old Zoe (Meredith Deane). For support, she turns to her more free-spirited younger sister, Judy (Marin Hinkle), with whom she works at their bookstore called My Sister's Bookstore (renamed Booklovers later in the series).

Lily's life changes when, during the pilot episode, she meets Rick Sammler (Billy Campbell) in the principal's office of Grace's school, Upton Sinclair High School.

Rick is a single father and co-head of an architectural firm, Sammler/Cassili Associates, which is located in downtown Chicago. Rick has been divorced from his uptight ex-wife Karen (Susanna Thompson) for three years and has two children, Eli (Shane West), a 16-year-old basketball player at Sinclair High who suffers from a learning disability, and sensitive 12-year-old Jessie (Evan Rachel Wood), who longs for the days before her family's disintegration.

Lily and Rick share an immediate mutual attraction and begin dating. Their budding relationship causes problems in both of their respective families. Grace strongly objects to Lily and Rick's relationship as she still hopes to see her parents get back together. Karen, a public interest attorney at the downtown law firm of Harris, Riegert, and Sammler, is worried about the toll Rick's new relationship would take on their children, particularly Jessie, who is shy and emotionally fragile. She is also working through her own feelings of jealousy that Rick is moving on to a new relationship.

In addition to Lily and Rick's relationship, the show also focused to a lesser degree on their exes, Jake and Karen, and their own struggles to move on in a post-divorce environment.

Plot summary

Season 1
Lily is in the process of divorcing her restaurateur husband, Jake. She is reluctant to begin dating again due to the sensitivities of her daughters, who are still emotional about the divorce. She meets and is instantly attracted to divorced architect Rick Sammler. However, their new relationship is complicated by Lily's many remaining emotional and financial issues with Jake. Lily must navigate the complicated worlds of divorce, finding herself in midlife, and reentering the workforce.  She is able to find strength and resilience as she affirms her marriage to Jake is over, starts a new job as a publishing assistant at the magazine Pages Alive, and grows in her relationship with Rick.  Grace and Eli become close when she becomes his tutor.  Judy has a relationship with Rick's friend, Sam Blue (Steven Weber) before discovering Sam is married.

Season 2
Lily and Jake's divorce is finalized and she hopes to spend more time with Rick. However, Rick becomes sidetracked by difficulties at work and has to begin working with unscrupulous developer Miles Drentell (David Clennon, reprising his role from the series thirtysomething). Things become difficult for Lily when Rick's project runs into legal difficulties and his ex-wife Karen is hired to represent the opposition. Jessie flirts with an eating disorder and begins to address her problems with the help of a therapist (played by show producer Edward Zwick). Jake's girlfriend Tiffany announces she is pregnant. At the end of season two, Rick has to dissolve his architectural firm, and Lily and Rick get married.

Season 3
Rick resumes his partnership with Sam Blue, now divorced, to design a hotel for a new client.  Sam and Judy try to be friends but eventually resume their romantic relationship. Jake and Tiffany have a baby girl and eventually decide to get married.  Grace develops a crush on her English teacher, Mr. Dimitri (Eric Stoltz); although their relationship never became sexual, an investigation eventually forces Mr. Dimitri to leave the school. Meanwhile, Jessie discovers she is attracted to another girl: upperclassman Katie Singer (Mischa Barton), and after Katie acknowledges her own romantic feelings towards Jessie with a love letter, the two girls quietly begin dating while hiding their romance from everyone, in what became the first teen lesbian romance on American network television. Karen deals with her depression; just as she is starting to make progress, she is hit by a car, leading to months of painful rehabilitation where she meets physical therapist Henry Higgins (D. B. Woodside). Lily faces more painful domestic struggles when her mother begins to show signs of Alzheimer's disease and her brother Aaron (Patrick Dempsey), who is schizophrenic, wants to move in with his girlfriend. By the end of the season, Rick and Lily face big decisions when he is offered a job in Australia and she is offered a nationally syndicated radio show. Their decisions are never shown, but in the last moments of the series finale, Lily reveals she is pregnant and everyone comes together to attend Jake and Tiffany's wedding.

Cast

Main

 Sela Ward as Lily Manning: Grace and Zoe's mother, separated from Jake
 Billy Campbell as Rick Sammler: Eli and Jessie's father, divorced from Karen
 Jeffrey Nordling as Jake Manning: Lily's estranged husband, Grace and Zoe's father
 Susanna Thompson as Karen Sammler: Rick's ex-wife, Eli and Jessie's mother
 Shane West as Eli Sammler: Rick's son
 Julia Whelan as Grace Manning: Lily's elder daughter
 Evan Rachel Wood as Jessie Sammler: Rick's daughter
 Meredith Deane as Zoe Manning: Lily's younger daughter
 Marin Hinkle as Judy Brooks: Lily's younger sister
 Todd Field as David Cassilli (season 2; recurring season 1): Rick's business partner and friend
 Ever Carradine as Tiffany Porter (seasons 2–3; recurring season 1): Jake's mistress/girlfriend
 Jennifer Crystal Foley as Christie Parker (season 2): Lily's boss at PagesAlive.com
 David Clennon as Miles Drentell (season 2): Rick and David's primary client
 Steven Weber as Samuel Blue (season 3; recurring season 1): Rick's friend and Judy's lover

Recurring
 Kimberly McCullough as Jennifer: Eli's girlfriend before Cassidy and before Carla
 Kelly Coffield as Naomi Porter: Lily and Karen's mutual friend
 James Eckhouse as Lloyd Lloyd: Karen's ill-fated date
 Paul Mazursky as Phil Brooks: Lily and Judy's father
 Bonnie Bartlett as Barbara Brooks: Lily and Judy's mother
 Mark Feuerstein as Leo Fisher: Karen's younger boyfriend
 Alexandra Holden as Cassidy: Eli's girlfriend after Jennifer
 Patrick Dempsey as Aaron Brooks: Lily and Judy's schizophrenic brother
 Audrey Marie Anderson as Carla Aldrich: Eli's girlfriend
 Mark Valley as Will Gluck: Handyman and Judy's lover
 D. B. Sweeney as Graham Rympalski: Lily and Christie's co-worker at PagesAlive.com
 Marco Gould as Spencer Lewicki: Grace's boyfriend
 Eric Stoltz as August Dimitri: Grace's English teacher/acting coach/romantic interest
 Paul Dooley as Les Creswell: Lily's boss at WIPX
 Mischa Barton as Katie Singer: Jessie's friend/girlfriend
 Christina Chang as Amanda: One of Rick's employees

Notes

Episodes

Season 1 (1999–2000)

Season 2 (2000–01)

Season 3 (2001–02)

Production
The series was filmed at the Century Studio Corporation sound stages in Culver City, California, and also on location in the Los Angeles area.

DVD releases
Walt Disney Studios Home Entertainment (formerly Buena Vista Home Entertainment) released Season 1 on November 5, 2002, mere months after the series finale. However, it took three more years and numerous petition drives for season two to be released, which occurred on August 23, 2005.  A little over a month later, on September 30, 2005, news broke about the release of the third and final season, which was slated to occur on January 10, 2006. Mock-up photos of the packaging were even released. However, by October 2005 the title was delayed indefinitely with no explanation and was never released.

It was almost two years before another official word was uttered on the subject and in July 2007, it was reported that Buena Vista's license on the program was soon to expire. As a result, a new company could acquire the distribution rights to the title and potentially release the third season.

Ratings

Awards

References

External links
 

1990s American drama television series
1999 American television series debuts
2000s American drama television series
2002 American television series endings
1990s American LGBT-related drama television series
2000s American LGBT-related drama television series
American Broadcasting Company original programming
Deerfield, Illinois
English-language television shows
Lesbian-related television shows
Primetime Emmy Award-winning television series
Television series by ABC Studios
Television shows filmed in Los Angeles
Television shows set in Illinois